Brian George Hayward (born June 25, 1960) is a Canadian former professional ice hockey goaltender who currently serves as a Color commentator for Anaheim Ducks broadcasts on Prime Ticket/Bally Sports SoCal/Bally Sports West and KDOC.

Playing career
Hayward played college hockey at Cornell University from 1978–1982.  In his senior season he was named first team All-Ivy, All-ECAC and was an All-American.  He set a school record with 2,225 saves and had a career won-lost record of 42-27-2.

Undrafted, Hayward signed a free agent contract with the Winnipeg Jets and moved between the Jets and their AHL affiliate for several years before becoming a regular NHL player. In 1984-85 he won a career high 33 games, setting a franchise record. He was traded to the Montreal Canadiens before the 1986-87 season and played with Patrick Roy. For three consecutive seasons they shared the William M. Jennings Trophy, awarded to the team that allows the fewest goals during the regular season. In 1990 he was traded to the Minnesota North Stars where he played for one season. In 1991, he was acquired by the San Jose Sharks in the Dispersal Draft and he was in net for the Sharks when they won their first NHL regular season game, against the Calgary Flames.  He retired from playing in 1993.

Broadcasting career
He is the television color commentator for the Anaheim Ducks, a role he served since the team's inception. He also occasionally works as a reporter or color commentator for CBC's Hockey Night in Canada. Hayward has also called games for ABC, NBC, ESPN, ESPN2 and NHL International. While at ESPN, he served as color commentator for the 2004 World Cup of Hockey and as a roving reporter during the 1998 playoffs, where he interviewed President Bill Clinton during a game in Washington, D.C.. While with NBC, he called games at the 2006 Winter Olympics in Torino, Italy. He also co-hosts Ducks Live, after every Ducks game.

In the 2012 playoffs, Hayward joined the NBCSN as an "Inside-the-Glass" reporter.

Personal life
Hayward currently resides in Anaheim Hills, California with his wife Angela and daughter Courtney.

Awards and honors

William M Jennings Award

1986-87 (shared with Patrick Roy)

1987-88 (shared with Patrick Roy)

1988-89 (shared with Patrick Roy)

Career statistics

Regular season and playoffs

References

External links 
Brian Hayward's biography at Legends of Hockey

 Brian Hayward Stats

1960 births
Anaheim Ducks announcers
Canadian ice hockey goaltenders
Cornell Big Red men's ice hockey players
Ice hockey people from Ontario
Living people
Minnesota North Stars players
Montreal Canadiens players
National Hockey League broadcasters
People from the Regional Municipality of Halton
San Jose Sharks players
Undrafted National Hockey League players
Winnipeg Jets (1979–1996) players
William M. Jennings Trophy winners
People from Anaheim Hills, California
San Jose Sharks announcers
AHCA Division I men's ice hockey All-Americans